Greenhorn is a slang for an inexperienced person, or a slur against Portuguese people in New England, United States. It may also refer to:

Places 
 Greenhorn, California, United States
 Greenhorn Mountain, a mountain in Colorado
 Greenhorn, Oregon, United States

Other 
 The Greenhornes, a rock band from Cincinnati, Ohio
 Greenhorn Limestone, a widespread geologic unit in the plains and mountainous Western United States